Ecyroschema tuberculatum is a species of beetle in the family Cerambycidae. It was described by Stephan von Breuning in 1948. It is known from Nigeria, Somalia, and Togo.

Subspecies
 Ecyroschema tuberculatum hecphora Téocchi, 1988
 Ecyroschema tuberculatum tuberculatum Breuning, 1948

References

Crossotini
Beetles described in 1948